Hudson Hope may refer to:
 Hudson's Hope, a community, on the Peace River, in British Columbia
 Hudson's Hope (ship, 1920), see Boats of the Mackenzie River watershed
 Hudson Hope (ship, 1915), see Boats of the Mackenzie River watershed